Marie Granlund (born 1962) is a Swedish social democratic politician who was a member of the Riksdag from 1994 to 2018.

External links
Marie Granlund at the Riksdag website

1962 births
Living people
Members of the Riksdag from the Social Democrats
Women members of the Riksdag
Members of the Riksdag 2002–2006
21st-century Swedish women politicians
Members of the Riksdag 1994–1998
Members of the Riksdag 1998–2002
Members of the Riksdag 2006–2010
Members of the Riksdag 2010–2014
Members of the Riksdag 2014–2018
20th-century Swedish politicians
21st-century Swedish politicians